Rhus sandwicensis, commonly known as neneleau, neleau or Hawaiian sumac, is a species of flowering plant in the cashew family, Anacardiaceae, that is endemic to Hawaii.

The Latin specific epithet of sandwicensis refers to the "Sandwich Islands," as the Hawaiian Islands were once called, and named by James Cook on one of his voyages in the 1770s. James Cook named the islands after John Montagu, 4th Earl of Sandwich for supporting Cook's voyages.

Uses
Neneleau wood was used by Native Hawaiians to make laau lomi lomi (massage sticks) and umeke (calabashes).

Cultural significance
Neneleau is mentioned in the Kumulipo, the Hawaiian creation chant.

References

External links

sandwicensis
Endemic flora of Hawaii
Trees of Hawaii
Plants described in 1854
Flora without expected TNC conservation status